Yakshayevo (Yaqşay) is a rural locality (a village) in Karatovsky Selsoviet, Tuymazinsky District, Bashkortostan, Russia. The population was 85 as of 2010. There are 2 streets.

Geography 
Yakshayevo is located 45 km southwest of Tuymazy (the district's administrative centre) by road. Kozhay-Andreyevo is the nearest rural locality.

References 

Rural localities in Tuymazinsky District